Bakr Ibrahim Saleh (1923 – 16 July 2014) was a Saudi diplomat and from 1994 Assistant Secretary General for Political Affairs of the Organisation of Islamic Cooperation.

Career
In 1948 Bakr joined the Foreign Service and was employed until 1953 in the Ministry of Foreign Affairs (Saudi Arabia). From 1953 to 1957 he was consul in the mission next to the Headquarters of the United Nations. From 1958 to 1959 he was first-class legation secretary in Cairo the capital of the United Arab States. From 1962 to 1966 he was chargé d'affaires from 1965 Ministre plénipotentireire in Accra (Ghana). From 1966 to 1968 he headed the West Department in the Ministry of Foreign Affairs. From 1968 to 1974 he was ambassador to Jakarta. From 1975 to 1980, he was ambassador to Tehran, where in 1976 he bought an impressive villa for about 4 million US dollars. From February 16, 1980 to March 15, 1983 he was ambassador to Caracas. From 15 March 1983 to 28 June 1994 he was Permanent Representative of the Kingdom of Saudi Arabia to the European Commission in Brussels.

Starting in 1994 he was Assistant Secretary General for Political Affairs of the Organisation of Islamic Cooperation. He performed a number of tasks. For example, in 1995 he was the representative of the OIK Secretary-General in Kabul and Jalalabad.

References

1923 births
2014 deaths
Ambassadors of Saudi Arabia to Iran
Ambassadors of Saudi Arabia to Indonesia
Ambassadors of Saudi Arabia to Venezuela
Ambassadors of Saudi Arabia to Ghana
Organisation of Islamic Cooperation
Saudi Arabian expatriates in the United States
Saudi Arabian expatriates in Egypt